Claudia Katz is an American animation producer. Katz is a partner and Executive Vice President of Rough Draft Studios.

Life
Katz is a graduate of Franklin & Marshall College Class of 1988. Katz is Jewish.

In 1994, Katz joined Rough Draft Studios to produce numerous projects for film and television including The Maxx, Futurama and Drawn Together. Claudia has received Emmy and Hugo Awards for her work on Futurama.

References

External links

American television producers
American women television producers
Living people
Franklin & Marshall College alumni
Year of birth missing (living people)
Emmy Award winners
21st-century American women